Tirso Silvano Cruz III (born April 1, 1952) is a Filipino actor, comedian, and singer. He currently serves as the Chairperson of the Film Development Council of the Philippines. Regarded as a "matinee idol", Cruz is a FAMAS Award and Gawad Urian Award recipient.

Early life
Tirso Silvano Cruz III was born at 2:46 AM on April 1, 1952 at University of Santo Tomas Hospital in Sampaloc, Manila to Tirso Bailey Cruz, Jr. and Elma Acosta Silvano. He is the grandson by paternal line of Tirso Muñoz Cruz Sr. and María Loreto Lagrosa Bailey, and by maternal line of Tomas Silvano and Petra Acosta. Loreto's father, Lewis Edwin Bailey, was an American soldier, from Stowe, Vermont, and was the son of French Canadian immigrants.

Personal life
Cruz married Erlinda "Lynn" Erillo Ynchausti in 1981. The couple have two sons and one daughter, TJ (October 22, 1981 - November 21, 2018), Bodie and Djanin. Bodie Cruz was a housemate in Pinoy Big Brother: Season 2. On November 21, 2018, his eldest son TJ died of cancer, at the age of 37.

Cruz was raised a Roman Catholic, but converted to Evangelical Christianity in 2009.

On July 5, 2022, he was appointed by President Bongbong Marcos as the chairperson of the Film Development Council of the Philippines replacing Liza Diño.

Discography
 Tirso Cruz III
 By Special Request
 PIP
 Pip at the Top
 Hawaiian Souvenirs
 TCIII
 Afterglow
 Rock and Roll Music
 Butterfly
 The Sound of Pip
 Pip Dimension

Filmography

Television

Film

Awards and nominations

Gawad Urian Awards
1996 Gawad Urian Best Supporting Actor - Inagaw mo ang lahat sa akin (nom.)
2003 Gawad Urian Best Supporting Actor - Mano po (nom.)
2011 Gawad Urian Best Supporting Actor - Sigwa (nom.)
2012 Gawad Urian Best Actor - Bisperas (nom.)
2016 Gawad Urian Best Supporting Actor - Honor Thy Father (nom.)

Golden Screen Awards
2004 Golden Screen Award Best Supporting Actor-The Debut 
2011 Golden Screen Award Best Performance by an Actor in a Supporting Role (Drama, Musical or Comedy)-Sigwa 
2012 Golden Screen Award Best Performance by an Actor in a Supporting Role (Drama, Musical or Comedy)- Deadline: The Reign of Impunity (nom)
2013 Golden Screen Award Dekada Award

*Star Awards for Movies
1990 Actor of the Year-Bilangin ang bituin sa langit
2011 Movie Supporting Actor of the Year-Sigwa
2012 Movie Supporting Actor of the Year-Deadline: The Reign of Impunity (nom)
2016 Movie Supporting Actor of the Year-Deadline: Honor Thy Father

Metro Manila Film Festival
2015 Best Supporting Actor-Honor Thy Father
1997 PMPC Star Awards for Television Best Drama Actor - Valiente

Cinemalaya Independent Film Festival
2010 -  Best Actor-Sigwa

TV Awards
 2013 Outstanding Supporting Actor in a Drama Series-Budoy (nom)
 2014 Outstanding Supporting Actor in a Drama Series-Huwag ka lang mawawala (nom)
 1997 PMPC Star Awards for Television Best Drama Actor - Valiente
 1973 Box Office King

Nominated

References

External links

1952 births
Living people
People from Las Piñas
People from Quezon City
Filipino people of Spanish descent
Tagalog people
Male actors from Nueva Ecija
Filipino male television actors
20th-century Filipino male singers
Filipino male child actors
Filipino evangelicals
Converts to evangelical Christianity from Roman Catholicism
Tirso III
Filipino people of French Canadian descent
ABS-CBN personalities
GMA Network personalities
Filipino male film actors
Vicor Music artists
Bongbong Marcos administration personnel
Filipino chief executives